Giske is an island in Giske Municipality in Møre og Romsdal county, Norway. The island is connected by the Giske Bridge to the neighbouring island of Valderøya to the east and by the Godøy Tunnel to the island of Godøya to the southwest. Giske Church, dating back to the 12th century, sits on the southern coast of the island.

The small island contains the  village also named Giske. The rest of the island's residents are spread out around the village on farms.

See also
List of islands of Norway

References

External links

Islands of Møre og Romsdal
Giske